Tymbark SA, is a Polish fruit- juice beverage company. Its products are mainly available in all of 16 Polish voivodeships as well as in most of Germany. Tymbark is also a fruit and vegetable processing plant (launched in 1936 as a cooperative Owocarska, nationalized in 1950, and in 1995 was turned into a shareholder company of the State Treasury, now known as Podhale Company Food Industry "Tymbark" SA). Tymbark is a major producer of fruit and vegetable juices as well as jams, marmalades and fruit wines. In 1999, the company became part of Grupa Maspex Wadowice. The Tymbark brand was listed as Poland's 15th most popular brand in a survey by Wprost magazine. It is known as Topjoy in Hungary or Relax in Czechia and Slovakia.

History
In 1936, Joseph Marek first established the Tymbark Fruit Growers Cooperative in Podhale, Poland. Formal registration of the Cooperative Act was made in the Circuit Hall in Nowy Sącz, on May 1937. Then the file was included in Podhalanska Frut Growers Cooperative in Tymbark. In the year 1949 the company has bought the first car in Tymbark  – throughout its history Tymbark has been a leading company of innovation and technology. In 1967, Rogozinski Augustine had developed the first black currant recipe in Poland. Before the year 1990, Tymbark's logo was a logo of two cockerels, it was not recognised and in 1991 there was a new design for the logo of a fruit, which was the apple. In 1993 Tymbark began its iconic recognition of the inscription on the cap; at the beginning there were only eight, such as Ears Up, Hold Up, Smile, Will, Forever Together, I  got you, How are you? and the first was Ears Up, now there are 490 different inscriptions in the caps and many people such as children collect different ones as a game.

In 2003, Tymbark introduced its Fruit of the World, the new flavours gave its consumers a taste of exotic tastes such as kiwi, cactus, currant and many others. In 2004, Tymbark was the first company in Poland to introduce the aseptic bottling of juices and beverages into plastic bottles without artificial colours and preservatives. In the same year 2004, Tymbark saw a rise in customers of its Fruit of the World and introduced its new Premium range of nectars of different fruit.

In 2007, the company started its active educational program on healthy eating based in the Eat Five A Day of servings of vegetables and fruit and Tymbark also conducted research by asking customers questions about their tastes. This attracted responses from several hundred thousand children in Poland. In 2007, Tymbark started its From the Backyard to the Stadium program which trained children for the Tymbark Cup where boys and girls in the under ten category play football in an official children's cup.  The Tymbark Cup is the largest children cup in Poland. In the year 2011, 85,000 children across Poland were involved. In 2008, Tymbark promoted "Desire". In 2009, Tymbark introduced its new product "Lemonade", which has its own slogan, "Ideal For a Hot Summer".

In 2010, Tymbark's new program began called, "I know what I drink" (Wiem co piję). This was clearly placed on each of Tymbark's products. This made the customer sure the Tymbark product had no added sugar, preservatives or artificial colours. The products also included the GDA index value. Today one popular flavour is apple-mint.

Products
The first Tymbark product was the apple flavour which was the only flavour from 1936 to 1967. Tymbark now has many different product ranges, listed below:

 Juices and Nectars – flavours  are:  Apple, Orange,  Multivitamin, Grapefruit, Tomato 100%, Pineapple 100% and Cherry
 Drinks – flavours are : Apple–Mint, Apple–Cherry, Apple–Peach, Apple–Watermelon, Apple–Gooseberry, Orange–Peach, Orange-Grapefruit, Apple–Redcurrant, Apple–White grapes and Raspberry-Mint
 Fruit of the World – flavours are: Cactus, Pomegranate, Mango, Cranberry, Lychee, Green Banana and Kiwi 
 Vega  – flavours are: Mediterranean Garden, Sunny Mexico and Provencal Fields
 Lemoniada (Lemonade) – flavours are: Lemon, Lemon - Rhubarb and Lemon–Grapefruit
 Duo Fruo – flavours are: Orange and Strawberry, Mango and Peach and Banana and Pineapple
 Fresh Juice – flavours are: Fresh Orange Juice, Fresh Apple Juice and ''Fresh Carrot Juice

Tymbark also launched its Tymbark Box products designed in Winnie The Pooh characters for children, these product flavours are:

 Apple 100%
 Orange 100%
 Multivitamin 100%
 Apple - Peach 100%
 Raspberry - Apple - Cherry - Grapes 100%
 Multifruit 100%
 Banana - Apple - Lemon (Designed in Cars film characters)
 Orange - Apple - Lemon - Peach (Designed in Cars film characters) 
 Wild Strawberry - Apple - Chokeberry - Cherry (Designed in  Disney's Cinderella characters)

Tymbark has made its own Jam and Dressing products which are:

 Jams – Strawberry, Peach, Cherry, Plum, Raspberry, Blueberry' Jams
 Honey
 Sauces – Strawberry, Raspberry, Cherry, Chocolate, Blueberry, Advocat, Toffee Sauces

References

Condiment companies
Cooperatives in Poland
Drink companies of Poland
Fruit preserve companies
Polish brands
Soft drinks manufacturers